is a Japanese manga series written and illustrated by Kaori Yuki. It was serialized in Kodansha and Pixiv's manga application Palcy from October 2019 to November 2021.

Publication
Written and illustrated by Kaori Yuki, Beauty and the Beast of Paradise Lost was serialized in Kodansha and Pixiv's manga application Palcy from October 17, 2019, to November 25, 2021. Kodansha collected its chapters in five tankōbon volumes, released from February 13, 2020, to March 11, 2022.

The series was licensed for English release in North America by Kodansha USA.

Volume list

References

Further reading

External links

Dark fantasy anime and manga
Japanese webcomics
Kaori Yuki
Kodansha manga
Romance anime and manga
Shōjo manga
Webcomics in print
Works based on Beauty and the Beast